Leo Dunne was an Irish soccer player during the 1930s.

A left back, he was capped twice for the Irish Free State making his debut against Switzerland in May 1935.

Born in Dublin, possibly in 1908, between spells at Drumcondra in Dublin he played for Manchester City and Hull City in England from 1933 to 1936. He was mainly a reserve player at Manchester City to Bill Dale. Described in Tony Matthews' book "Manchester City: Player by Player" as "a first class defender", he made almost sixty appearances for the Blues' second team before moving to Hull.

The Winnipeg Tribune reported on 23 March 1935 "Leo Dunne is one of seven or eight very good backs at Manchester City. The other day Swindon Town asked if they might talk transfer with the City. It was arranged. Leo appeared "by request" in a game. He played so well that the City directors instantly decided that he was not to be transferred. Sooner or later though, the City will have to unload some back talent."

References

Republic of Ireland association footballers
Irish Free State international footballers
Year of birth missing
Irish Free State association footballers
Year of death missing
Association football defenders